The 2010 Korea Open Super Series was a badminton tournament which took place at SK Olympic Handball Gymnasium in Seoul, South Korea from 12 to 17 January 2010. It had a total purse of US$300,000, as the biggest prize money of Super Series event of the year.

The 2010 Korea Open Super Series became the first tournament of the 2010 BWF Super Series, and was the nineteenth edition of the Korea Open tournament, which had been held since 1991. This tournament was organized by Badminton Korea Association and sanctioned by the BWF.

Men's singles

Seeds 

 Lee Chong Wei (champion)
 Peter Gade (final)
 Chen Jin (semi-finals)
 Bao Chunlai (quarter-finals)
 Park Sung-hwan (quarter-finals)
 Nguyen Tien Minh (quarter-finals)
 Chen Long (semi-finals)
 Boonsak Ponsana (quarter-finals)

Finals

Top half

Section 1

Section 2

Bottom half

Section 3

Section 4

Women's singles

Seeds 

 Tine Rasmussen (second round)
 Zhou Mi (quarter-finals)
 Lu Lan (withdrew)
 Juliane Schenk (second round)
 Wang Xin (second round)
 Wang Shixian (champion)
 Yao Jie (quarter-finals)
 Salakjit Ponsana (first round)

Finals

Top half

Section 1

Section 2

Bottom half

Section 3

Section 4

Men's doubles

Seeds 

 Jung Jae-sung / Lee Yong-dae (champion)
 Mathias Boe / Carsten Mogensen (quarter-finals)
 Alvent Yulianto Chandra / Hendra Aprida Gunawan (quarter-finals)
 Lars Paaske / Jonas Rasmussen (second round)
 Cai Yun / Fu Haifeng (final)
 Xu Chen / Guo Zhendong (second round)
 Howard Bach / Tony Gunawan (first round)
 Gan Teik Chai / Tan Bin Shen (first round)

Finals

Top half

Section 1

Section 2

Bottom half

Section 3

Section 4

Women's doubles

Seeds 

 Cheng Shu / Zhao Yunlei (champion)
 Mizuki Fujii / Reika Kakiiwa (final)
 Duanganong Aroonkesorn / Kunchala Voravichitchaikul (quarter-finals)
 Miyuki Maeda / Satoko Suetsuna (withdrew)
 Petya Nedeltcheva /  Anastasia Russkikh (second round)
 Misaki Matsutomo / Ayaka Takahashi (quarter-finals)
 Savitree Amitapai / Vacharaporn Munkit (second round)
 Laura Choinet / Weny Rahmawati (second round)

Finals

Top half

Section 1

Section 2

Bottom half

Section 3

Section 4

Mixed doubles

Seeds 

 Lee Yong-dae / Lee Hyo-jung (first round)
 Joachim Fischer Nielsen / Christinna Pedersen (withdrew)
 He Hanbin / Yu Yang (champion)
 Songphon Anugritayawon / Kunchala Voravichitchaikul (quarter-finals)
 Robert Mateusiak / Nadieżda Kostiuczyk (first round)
 Sudket Prapakamol / Saralee Thoungthongkam (quarter-finals)
 Thomas Laybourn / Kamilla Rytter Juhl (quarter-finals)
 Ko Sung-hyun / Ha Jung-eun (quarter-finals)

Finals

Top half

Section 1

Section 2

Bottom half

Section 3

Section 4

References

External links
Korea Super Series 2010 at tournamentsoftware.com

Korea Open (badminton)
Korea Open Super Series, 2010
Sport in Seoul
Korea Open
January 2010 sports events in South Korea